Vignan's Foundation for Science, Technology and Research University is an deemed University in Andhra Pradesh, India, offering graduate (Masters)  under-graduate (Bachelors) and PhD courses in Engineering and Technology. It is located at Vadlamudi, Guntur, Andhra Pradesh

History
The college's first campus was established in 1997 at Vadlamudi. Later, another campus of the Engineering College started at Deshmukhi near Hyderabad.

It has been awarded Deemed University status, is approved by AICTE and NBA, and is an ISO 9001:2000 certified institution.

The college, established under the aegis of the Lavu Educational Trust, is the brainchild of its
founder, Dr. Lavu Rathaiah. Having made a mark at the plus two level of education, Vignan Group started schools across the state before venturing into professional courses like Engineering and Pharmacy.

Vignan Group today has academics activities ranging from schools, junior and degree colleges, PG
Centers, Engineering Colleges, Pharmacy Colleges and B.Ed. Colleges. VEC was the first of the engineering colleges to
start functioning, in 1997. The college is located along the Guntur – Tenali highway.

Guided by Dr. Lavu Rathaiah, the college has topped the Jawaharlal Nehru Technical University results twice in the last nine years.

Electronics and Communication Engineering
The department began in 1997, catering to the needs of four year B.Tech. ECE students. Up to 1999 the annual intake of ECE department was 40; in 1999 the intake was enhanced to 60; since 2000, the intake has been 120. The department initiated a PG program in M.Tech. in 2006. Consequent to the establishment of JNT University in Kakinada, the affiliations of both programmes were shifted to the new university from 2008 onwards. The undergraduate programme Electronics and Communication was accredited by NBA in 2006. In 2008, the college was accredited by NAAC and awarded an ‘A’ grade. The institution has been conferred with Deemed-to-be University status by UGC from January 2009.

Faculty
 Dr.R.P.Das (HOD of ECE branch)

Computer Science and Engineering
The department of CSE was started in 1997. The department began with an annual intake of 40, and reached 120 students in 2001. The department provides computing resources for research and education. This includes more than 200 computers with Linux and Windows platforms. The School of Computing has around 50 faculty who are specialists in the areas of Databases, Data Mining, Computer Architecture, Operating Systems, Image Processing, Wireless Networks, Artificial Neural Networks, Information Security and Programming Languages. The department also conducts co-circullar activities on the name of VCODE.

Faculty
 Dr K.venkata rao (Former HOD of CSE branch)
 Dr.D.Bhattacharyya (HOD of CSE branch)

Information technology
The department started in 1999 with an intake of 30. The intake of the department has since been increased by 150 over a span of 6 years. In Visakhapatnam branch, the head of the department of information technology branch Sri Bode Prasad is one of the most noticeable person, for his efforts in NSS services, and many inevitable effort of student rights and well-being.

Faculty
 Dr. Bode Prasad. PhD  -Dean of examination cell (former HOD of IT branch)
 K.V.N. Rajesh -H.O.D & Asst.prof 
 R.Daniel -Asso.prof
 Pilla Srinivas Rao -Asst.prof (system cell incharge)
 Pasam Prudvi Kiran -Asst.prof (Discipline committee member)
 K.NAGARJUNA -Asso.prof
 CH. SRINIVASA REDDY-Asso.prof

Electrical and Electronics Engineering
The undergraduate program in Electrical and Electronics Engineering was started in 1999 with an annual intake of 40 students. By 2001, the intake was 60. The department started a postgraduate program, M.Tech. (Power Electronics and Drives) with an annual intake of 80 students in 2006.

Faculty
 Dr.PUDI SEKHAR(HOD of EEE branch)

Chemical Engineering
The department of Chemical Engineering began in 1997. Starting with a student intake of 40, the intake was 60 in 2002. The M.Tech. program was introduced in 2004. Chemical Engineering has faculty who are specialists in the areas of Fluid Mechanics, Heat Transfer, Mass Transfer Operations, Chemical Reaction Engineering, Mechanical Unit Operations, Process Dynamics and Control, Chemical Technology, Chemical Engineering Thermodynamics, Chemical Process Calculations, Chemical Process Equipment Design and Chemical Process Modeling, Simulation and Optimization.

Mechanical Engineering
The department began in 1997 with a student intake of 60. The postgraduate program, offering specialization in machine design, was started in 2005. The faculty have specializations in the areas of Design, Thermal, Production and Industrial engineering. The faculty strength is 17 comprising two professors, six Associate Professors and nine Assistant Professors...

Bio–technology
The college started a Bio–Technology branch in 2006 with an intake of 60.

Civil Engineering
The Department of Civil Engineering is committed to research and development in civil engineering. started in the year 2008.

Faculty
 Dr. Balla Satyanaryan (HOD of Civil branch)

Library facility
The library subscribes to online IEEE and ASME journals. The digital library with high speed Internet connection and access to online journals helps students prepare for competitive exams like GATE, GRE, CAT, TOFEL besides collating and compiling material for paper presentation, seminar etc.

The library has
 more than 40,000 volumes
 audio-visual materials
 about 200 national and international journals
 a reading room
 
It is air-conditioned with a seating capacity of about 600 students, and has a separate area for research students.

The Library is managed with Library Management Software. Using this software, cataloguing as well as circulation services are automated. Digital resources like 1500 multimedia CDs and internet are available.

Training and placement cell
Equipped with trained personnel the facility started in 2000. The trainers understand the training requirements of undergraduate students and design programmes to help students attain career success.

T and P cell at VEC conducts campus recruitment drives. Some of the industries which visit the campus are
TATA Consultancy services
Infosys Technologies
Wipro Technologies
VIRTUSA Technologies
SONATA Software
Mahindra & Mahindra
B2B Software
OSI Technologies
Mphasis Technologies
Sutherland Global services
Mind edutainment
Polaris 
Amazon
Genpact
MORDOR intelligence 
Google 
Facebook 
Mphasis etc.

The cell organises guidance programs, reasoning tests, aptitude tests, puzzle solving, group discussions, mock interviews, brain storming sessions, case studies, pick and speak, experience sharing and minipresentations.

The Training and Placement Cell organizes training programs for the students of all semesters with the help of in-house experts and resource personnel drawn from professional agencies.

Internet facility
PCs are provided around the university. An intranet portal provides personalized online services and access to information and learning resources for all students. A 16 MBPS Wi-Fi network connection is provided round the clock. Vignan has e-learning tools which provide access to lecture materials, communication with students and tutors through online discussions, web based resources in text, video, audio and image formats, online tests and assignment submission.

 Gbit/s Fiber Optic backbone and 100 Mbit/s connectivity to individual systems in the intranet.
 More than 1000 computers and 20 servers are available to the students and faculty.
 E-mail facility available to the students and faculty for paperless communication.
 Parents can have an access to Management Information about their children's attendance and performance
 Students can access E-learning resources through intranet servers.

Transport
 Vignan is located along National Highway-5 and lies between Guntur and Tenali in Andhra Pradesh. t is 13 km from Guntur and 12 km from Tenali.
 It is well connected by road, rail and aircraft. The biggest railway junction in South India (Vijayawada) is an hours drive from the campus.
 Gannavaram Airport, providing passenger service to cities like Bangalore, Chennai and Hyderabad, is about 90 minutes drive from the campus.
 The college has a fleet of 32 buses, operating along two routes of Guntur and Tenali with a seating capacity of 1800 students. The college maintains ten cars for meeting the transport requirements of the senior faculty.

Open-air theatres
Two open-air theatres have a seating capacity of 15,000 to 20,000 students. A regular event in the theatre is Vignan Mahostav - a National Level Youth Festival.

Seminar halls
There are two (250 sq.m. and 250 seating capacity each) centrally air-conditioned seminar halls. Each hall is fitted with a projector and public address system. These seminar halls are also used for cultural programs like dance, drama and music.

Recreation and sports facilities
The campus is equipped with facilities for outdoor games like cricket, football, volleyball, tennis, basketball and 400 meter track athletics.

References

External links
TechBirBal.com -- Engineering syllabus, question papers, Ebooks, notes and mock exams
College website

Colleges in Guntur
Engineering colleges in Andhra Pradesh
1997 establishments in Andhra Pradesh
Educational institutions established in 1997